"House Party" is a song co-written and recorded by American country music singer Sam Hunt. It was released to country radio, by MCA Nashville on June 1, 2015 as the third single from his debut studio album Montevallo (2014). The song was written by Hunt, Zach Crowell and Jerry Flowers.

Critical reception
Taste of Country reviewed the song favorably, saying "This singer continues to stretch the genre to the delight of some and the agony of others. Acoustic guitar drives the beat in 'House Party,' while a very country-sounding guitar lick works around his melodic, syncopated lyrics. This is Hunt’s lightest single to date, as well."

Commercial performance
The song first charted on the Country Digital Songs chart at number 31 for the week of August 20, 2014, the week his EP X2C was released, selling 12,000 copies in the US. It re-entered on the chart at number 29 for the week of May 23, 2015, preceding its official release as a single with sales of 10,000. It entered the Hot Country Songs chart on the next week at number 31. It first entered the Country Airplay chart for the week of January 2015, but gained traction in May in anticipation of its release as a single. It entered the US Billboard Hot 100 at number 85 for the week of June 20, 2015. The song reached number one on the Hot Country Songs chart for the week of August 22, 2015, becoming the third number one song from his debut studio album on that chart. It peaked at number 26 on the US Billboard Hot 100 two weeks later. The song was certified Platinum by the RIAA on August 28, 2015, and it reached its million sales mark in the US by January 2016. As of February 2016, the song has sold 1,121,000 copies in the US.

Music videos
Two music videos were produced for the song. The first music video, directed by Brad Belanger and Steven Worster, premiered in August 2014. A second music video, directed by Justin Key and Steven Worster, premiered in June 2015.

Charts

Weekly charts

Year-end charts

Certifications and sales

References

2015 singles
Sam Hunt songs
MCA Nashville Records singles
Songs written by Sam Hunt
Songs written by Zach Crowell
2014 songs
Song recordings produced by Shane McAnally
Songs written by Jerry Flowers